Larry Charles (born ) is an American comedian, screenwriter, director, actor, and producer. He was a staff writer for the sitcom Seinfeld for its first five seasons. He has also directed the documentary film Religulous and the mockumentary comedy films Borat, Brüno, and The Dictator. His Netflix documentary series Larry Charles' Dangerous World of Comedy premiered in 2019.

Early life
Charles was raised in a Jewish family in Trump Village, located between Brighton Beach and Coney Island in Brooklyn, New York.

After graduating from John Dewey High School, he attended college at Rutgers University in New Jersey, but he left school to perform comedy routines.

Career

Early career
Charles performed stand-up comedy during the 1970s until he was hired to write for the short-lived sketch comedy show Fridays, where he worked with Larry David. This began Charles's career in television writing that included The Arsenio Hall Show and eventually Seinfeld. David gave him the job as a writer on Seinfeld and his directorial debut on Curb Your Enthusiasm.

Seinfeld
Although series co-creators Larry David and Jerry Seinfeld wrote the bulk of the show's episodes during the early seasons, Charles was their second in command during this period. Charles had met Seinfeld co-creator David when he was part of the writing staff of the ABC sketch show Fridays, on which David and Michael Richards were also part of the show's ensemble cast. Charles had been unable to write for the show's first season, as he had been writing for The Arsenio Hall Show.

Charles is noted for contributing some of the show's darker storylines and scenes. In the season two episode "The Baby Shower" Charles wrote a dream sequence in which the title character, Jerry Seinfeld, was killed. Charles's episodes also covered such controversial topics as Nazis (in "The Limo"), a psychotic stalker (in "The Opera") and a hospital patient committing suicide (in "The Bris"). A season two episode he wrote, "The Bet", concerning Elaine buying a handgun to protect herself, was never filmed because NBC, some of the cast, and the show's director felt the gun content was too provocative. Charles claimed that his writing on Seinfeld was heavily influenced by Dragnet, Superman and Abbott and Costello.

Charles said he was instrumental in the development of Cosmo Kramer; he felt that "Jerry and George were so well-defined through Larry David and Jerry, that there was less room for me to, sort of, expand on those personas. But Kramer was very unformed at the beginning of the show and it gave me an area of creativity to, sort of, expand upon. So I spent a lot of time with Kramer because he was a character that I could have an impact on in the future of the show". It was Charles who imbued in Kramer a distrust of authority (especially in his episodes "The Baby Shower" and "The Heart Attack"), and who created the character of Kramer's notorious unseen friend Bob Sacamano, after his real-life friend of the same name.

Film
Charles's feature debut was Masked and Anonymous (2003) which he directed, and co-wrote with Bob Dylan (under the pseudonyms Rene Fontaine and Sergei Petrov, respectively). The film received a mixed reaction from audiences and critics alike; it did poorly at the box office. Charles maintains it takes many viewings to get true enjoyment from the film: "I want the movie to be like a great Bob Dylan song that is listened to over and over and for people to [go] back and see it again and get a lot more things, or totally different things."

His second feature film as director, the Sacha Baron Cohen comedy mockumentary Borat!, was much more successful; it "set new records in terms of profitability; on a budget of 18 million dollars, it grossed in excess of 261 million dollars." In an interview, Charles discussed how, because of the nature of the mockumentary process, he had to act as well, even if none of his performance made it to the screen: "We all, especially me, had to play a character as well. I wasn't Larry Charles when we were on the road. We all had to be in character, and we had to balance that with our aesthetic and logistical needs to produce the movie properly [...] The director also had to act." The film was nominated for Best Motion Picture — Musical or Comedy at the Golden Globes.

Charles's third film was Religulous — a documentary about Bill Maher's take on the state of contemporary religion — which was released in October 2008.

Live performances
Charles rarely performs live, but has appeared at Un-Cabaret and can be heard on several of its podcasts.

Filmography

Film

Television

Seinfeld

Charles also has a cameo in the episode titled "The Parking Garage," which was written by David.

Mad About You
In 1995, Charles left the writing staff of Seinfeld to join that of another hugely successful mid-1990s sitcom: Paul Reiser's Mad About You.

The Tick, Dilbert
Charles served as executive producer on two short-lived programs, The Tick (for which he wrote two episodes), and the Dilbert animated series, which he co-developed with Scott Adams and co-wrote the following episodes:

Curb Your Enthusiasm
In 2000, Charles began his first job as a director on Curb Your Enthusiasm, Larry David's follow-up series to Seinfeld (which Larry David co-created). Charles directed 18 episodes of the hit HBO show.

Entourage
Charles served as an executive producer and writer on the HBO show Entourage for the first two seasons. The episodes that he wrote were:

References

External links

 
  in 2008
 Larry Charles judged The Film of the Month competition in July 2009 on the independent filmmakers networking site Shooting People.

1956 births
American male screenwriters
American television writers
Comedy film directors
Jewish American writers
Living people
People from Brooklyn
American male television writers
John Dewey High School alumni
Jewish American male comedians
Film directors from New York (state)
Screenwriters from New York (state)
21st-century American Jews
Jewish American comedy writers